The Somali Armed Forces are the military forces of the Federal Republic of Somalia. Headed by the president as commander-in-chief, they are constitutionally mandated to ensure the nation's sovereignty, independence and territorial integrity.

The SAF was initially made up of the Army, Navy, Air Force and Police Force. In the post-independence period, it grew to become among the larger militaries in Africa. Due to Barre's increasing reliance on his own clans, repressive policies, and the Somali Rebellion, the military had by 1988 begun to disintegrate. By the time President Siad Barre fled Mogadishu in January 1991, the last cohesive army grouping, the 'Red Berets,' had deteriorated into a clan militia. An unsteady rebuilding process began after 2000. In January 2014, the security sector was overseen by the Federal Government of Somalia's Ministry of Defence, Ministry of National Security, and Ministry of Interior and Federalism. The northeastern region of Puntland maintains its own separate military force.

History

Middle Ages to colonial period 
Historically, Somali society conferred distinction upon warriors (waranle) and rewarded military acumen. All Somali males were regarded as potential soldiers, except for men of religion. Somalia's many sultanates each maintained regular troops. In the early Middle Ages, the conquest of Shewa by the Ifat Sultanate ignited a rivalry for supremacy with the Solomonic dynasty.

Many similar battles were fought between the succeeding Sultanate of Adal and the Solomonids, with both sides achieving victory and suffering defeat. During the protracted Ethiopian-Adal War (1529–1559), Imam Ahmad ibn Ibrahim al-Ghazi defeated several Ethiopian Emperors and embarked on a conquest referred to as the Futuh Al-Habash ("Conquest of Abyssinia"), which brought three-quarters of Christian Abyssinia under the power of the Muslim Adal Sultanate. Al-Ghazi's forces and their Ottoman allies came close to extinguishing the ancient Ethiopian kingdom, but the Abyssinians managed to secure the assistance of Cristóvão da Gama's Portuguese troops and maintain their domain's autonomy. However, both polities in the process exhausted their resources and manpower, which resulted in the contraction of both powers and changed regional dynamics for centuries to come. Many historians trace the origins of hostility between Somalia and Ethiopia to this war. Some scholars also argue that this conflict proved, through their use on both sides, the value of firearms such as the matchlock musket, cannons and the arquebus over traditional weapons.

At the turn of the 20th century, the Majeerteen Sultanate, Sultanate of Hobyo, Warsangali Sultanate and Dervish State employed cavalry in their battles against the imperialist European powers during the Campaign of the Sultanates.

In Italian Somaliland, eight "Arab-Somali" infantry battalions, the Ascari, and several irregular units of Italian officered dubats were established. These units served as frontier guards and police. There were also Somali artillery and zaptié (carabinieri) units forming part of the Italian Royal Corps of Colonial Troops from 1889 to 1941. Between 1911 and 1912, over 1,000 Somalis from Mogadishu served as combat units along with Eritrean and Italian soldiers in the Italo-Turkish War. Most of the troops stationed never returned home until they were transferred back to Italian Somaliland in preparation for the invasion of Ethiopia in 1935.

In 1914, the Somaliland Camel Corps was formed in British Somaliland and saw service before, during, and after the Italian invasion of the territory during World War II.

1960 to 1978 

Just prior to independence in 1960, the Trust Territory of Somalia established a national army to defend the nascent Somali Republic's borders. A law to that effect was passed on 6 April 1960. Thus the Somali Police Force's Mobile Group (Darawishta Poliska or Darawishta) was formed. 12 April 1960 has since been marked as Armed Forces Day. British Somaliland became independent on 26 June 1960 as the State of Somaliland, and the Trust Territory of Somalia (the former Italian Somaliland) followed suit five days later. On 1 July 1960, the two territories united to form the Somali Republic.

After independence, the Darawishta merged with the former British Somaliland Scouts to form the 5,000 strong Somali National Army. The new military's first commander was Colonel Daud Abdulle Hirsi, a former officer in the British military administration's police force, the Somalia Gendarmerie. Officers were trained in the United Kingdom, Egypt and Italy. Despite the social and economic benefits associated with military service, the armed forces began to suffer chronic manpower shortages only a few years after independence.

Merging British and Italian Somaliland caused political controversy. The distribution of power between the two regions and among the major clans in both areas was a bone of contention. In December 1961, a group of British-trained northern non-commissioned officers in Hargeisa revolted after southern officers took command of their units. The rebellion was put down by other northern Noncommissioned officers (NCOs), although dissatisfaction in the north lingered. Adam notes that in the aftermath of this mutiny, first armed forces commander General Daud Abdulle Hirsi (Hawiye/Abgaal) placed the most senior northerner, Colonel Mohamed Haji Ainashe, as head of the army in the north.

By October 1962 British officials were reporting that there was a Northern Military Zone with its headquarters in Hargeisa, supervising two battalions in Hargisa and Burao, while in the south, Army HQ in Mogadishu supervised four battalions, at Mogadishu, Beletweyne, Galkayo, and Baidoa. These four battalions plus smaller units were to come under control of a planned Southern Military Zone.

The force was expanded and modernized after the rebellion with the assistance of Soviet and Cuban advisors. The Library of Congress wrote in the early 1990s that '[i]n 1962 the Soviet Union agreed to grant a US$32 million loan to modernise the Somali army, and expand it to 14,000 personnel. Moscow later increased the amount to US$55 million. The Soviet Union, seeking to counter United States influence in the Horn of Africa, made an unconditional loan' and set a 'generous twenty-year repayment schedule.' However other sources date the Somali-Soviet discussions to October 1963 or later, and discuss how the United States, West Germany, Great Britain, and Italy tried and failed to get Somalia to accept a Western counteroffer through 1962 and 1963.

The army was tested in 1964 when the conflict with Ethiopia over the Somali-inhabited Ogaden erupted into warfare. On 16 June 1963, Somali guerrillas started an insurgency at Hodayo, in eastern Ethiopia, a watering place north of Werder, after Ethiopian Emperor Haile Selassie rejected their demand for self-government in the Ogaden. The Somali government initially refused to support the guerrilla forces, which eventually numbered about 3,000. However, in January 1964, after Ethiopia sent reinforcements to the Ogaden, Somali forces launched ground and air attacks across the border and started providing assistance to the guerrillas. The Ethiopian Air Force responded with punitive strikes across its southwestern frontier against Feerfeer, northeast of Beledweyne, and Galkayo. On 6 March 1964, Somalia and Ethiopia agreed to a cease-fire. At the end of the month, the two sides signed an accord in Khartoum, Sudan, agreeing to withdraw their troops from the border, cease hostile propaganda, and start peace negotiations. Somalia also terminated its support of the guerrillas.

Soviet advisors, among them General Vasily Shakhnovich, began to arrive in 1969. The Institute for Strategic Studies listed Somalia for the first time in its green-covered Military Balance 1970-71, estimating total armed forces at 12,000, of which 10,000 were in the Army and 1,750 in the Air Force. General Shakhnovich built a close relationship with Barre, and stayed until 1971. General Grigory Borisov (:ru:Борисов, Григорий Григорьевич) served in the same position in 1973–76, writing a book about his experiences.

During the power vacuum that followed the assassination of Somalia's second president, Abdirashid Ali Shermarke, the military staged a coup d'état on 21 October 1969 (the day after Shermarke's funeral) and took over office. Major General Mohamed Siad Barre, who had succeeded Hersi as Chief of Army in 1965, was installed as President of the Supreme Revolutionary Council, the new junta of Somalia. The country was renamed the Somali Democratic Republic.

In 1972, the National Security Court, headed by Admiral Mohamed Gelle Yusuf, ordered the execution of Siad Barre's fellow coup instigators, Major General Mohamed Aynanshe Guleid (who had become the Vice President), Brigadier General Salaad Gabeyre Kediye and Lieutenant Colonel Abdulkadir Dheel Abdulle.

Kaplan wrote in 1976:
In mid-1976 the military command structure was simple and direct. Major General Mohammad Ali Samatar was not only commander of the National Army – and therefore commander of the organizationally subordinated navy and air force- but also secretary of state for defence and a vice president of SRC and thus a member of the major decision-making body of the government. Holding the two highest.. posts, he stood alone in the command structure between the army and President Siad, the head of state. When in July 1976 the SRC relinquished its power to the newly appointed SSRP, Samantar retained the portfolio of the Ministry of Defense. The country's real power appeared to be in the SSRP's Politburo, of which Samantar became a vice president. Before the military coup, command channels ran directly from the commander of the National Army to army sector commanders who exercised authority over military forces.. in the field, and by 1986 combat units had been reorganized along Soviet lines. There is no indication that either the chain of command to lower echelons or the organisation of combat units has changed significantly since the coup.

In July 1976, the International Institute for Strategic Studies estimated the army consisted of 22,000 personnel, 6 tank battalions, 9 mechanised infantry battalions, 5 infantry battalions, 2 commando battalions, and 11 artillery battalions (5 anti-aircraft). Two hundred T-34 and 50 T-54/55 main battle tanks had been estimated to have been delivered. The IISS emphasised that 'spares are short and not all equipment is serviceable.' The U.S. Army Area Handbook for Somalia, 1977 edition, agreed that the army comprised six tank and nine mechanised infantry battalions, but listed no infantry battalions, the two commando battalions, five field artillery, and five anti-aircraft battalions.

Three divisions (Division 21, Division 54, and Division 60) were formed, and later took part in the Ogaden War. There is evidence that the divisions were formed as early as 1970; Mohamud Muse Hersi has been listed by somaliaonline.com as commander of the 21st Division from 1970 to 1972, and Muse Hassan Sheikh Sayid Abdulle as commander 26th Division in 1970–71.

Under the leadership of General Abdullah Mohamed Fadil, Abdullahi Ahmed Irro and other senior Somali military officials formulated a plan of attack for what was to become the Ogaden War in Ethiopia. This was part of a broader effort to unite all of the Somali-inhabited territories in the Horn region into a Greater Somalia (Soomaaliweyn). At the start of the offensive, the SNA consisted of 35,000 soldiers, and was vastly outnumbered by the Ethiopian forces. Somali national army troops seized the Godey Front on 24 July 1977, after Division 60 defeated the Ethiopian 4th Infantry Division. Godey's capture allowed the Somali side to consolidate its hold on the Ogaden, concentrate its forces, and advance further to other regions of Ethiopia. The invasion reached an abrupt end with the Soviet Union's sudden shift of support to Ethiopia, followed by almost the entire communist world siding with the latter. The Soviets halted supplies to Barre's regime and instead increased the distribution of aid, weapons, and training to Ethiopia's newly communist Derg regime. General Vasily Petrov was assigned to restructure the Ethiopian Army. The Soviets also brought in around 15,000 Cuban troops to assist the Ethiopian military. By 1978, the Somali forces were pushed out of most of the Ogaden, although it would take nearly three more years for the Ethiopian Army to gain full control of Godey.

A key organisational change happened during the war. Battalions were succeeded by brigades. "During the war the standard infantry and mechanized infantry unit became the brigade,  two to four battalions and having a total strength of 1,200 to 2,000." Also following the war, Abudwak became the base for Division 21.

Decline and collapse, 1978–1991 

The shift in support by the Soviet Union during the Ogaden War motivated the Barre regime to seek allies elsewhere. The need for a rethink was emphasized by a failed coup d'état in 1978, which appears to have been poorly organised. Barre and his advisors eventually settled on the Soviet Union's Cold War arch-rival, the United States, which had been courting the Somali government for some time. The U.S. eventually gave extensive military support. Following the war, Barre's government began arresting government and military officials under suspicion of participation in the 1978 coup attempt. Most of the people who had allegedly helped plot the putsch were summarily executed. However, several officials managed to escape abroad where they formed the Somali Salvation Democratic Front (SSDF), the first of various dissident groups dedicated to ousting Barre's regime by force. Among these opposition movements were the Somali Patriotic Movement (SPM) and Somali Democratic Alliance (SDA), a Gadabuursi group which had been formed in the northwest to counter the Somali National Movement (SNM) Isaaq militia.

The armed forces continued to expand after the Ogaden War. The army expanded to 96,000 in 1980, of which combat forces made up 60,000. Thereafter the army grew to 115,000 and eventually to 123,000 by 1984–85.

In 1981 one of three corps headquarters for the ground forces was situated at Hargeisa in the northwestern Woqooyi Galbeed region. Others were believed to be garrisoned at Galkacyo in the north-central Mudug region and at Beledweyne in the south-central Hiiraan region. The ground forces were tactically organized into seven divisions. Allocated among the divisions were three mechanized infantry brigades, ten anti-aircraft battalions, and thirteen artillery battalions. The classified supplements to the CIA World Factbook for the 1980s, released thirty years later, show that the CIA estimated that the force had grown to eleven divisions by January 1984, and twelve divisions by 1986.

In 1984, the government attempted to solve the manpower shortage problem by instituting obligatory military service. Men of eighteen to forty years of age were to be conscripted for two years. Opposition to conscription and to the campaigns against guerrilla groups resulted in widespread evasion of military service. As a result, during the late 1980s the government normally met manpower requirements by impressing men into military service. This practice alienated an increasing number of Somalis, who wanted the government to negotiate a peaceful resolution of the conflicts that were slowly destroying Somali society.

However, as the 1980s wore on, Siad Barre increasingly used clanism as a political resource. Barre filled the key positions in the army and security forces with members of three Darood clans closely related to his own reer: the Marehan, Dhulbahante, and Ogaden known as the MOD Alliance . Adam says that '..As early as 1976, when Colonel Omar Mohamed Farah was asked to train and command a tank brigade stationed in Mogadishu, he found that out of about 540 soldiers, at least 500 were from the Marehan clan. The whole tank division was headed by a Marehan officer, Umar Haji Masala.' Compagnon wrote in 1992: "Colonels and generals were part of the president's personal patronage network; they had to remain loyal to him and his relatives, whether they had command or were temporarily in the cabinet." As a result, by 1990 many Somalis looked upon the armed forces as Siad Barre's personal army. This perception eventually destroyed the military's reputation as a national institution. The critical posts of commander of the 2nd Tank Brigade and 2nd Artillery Brigade in Mogadishu were both held by Marehan officers, as were the posts of commander of the three reserve brigades in Hargeisa in the north.

By 1987 the U.S. Defense Intelligence Agency estimated the army was 40,000 strong (with Ethiopian army strength estimated at the same time as 260,000). The President, Mohamed Siad Barre, held the rank of Major General and acted as Minister of Defence. There were three vice-ministers of national defence. From the SNA headquarters in Mogadishu four sectors were directed: 26th Sector at Hargeisa, 54th Sector at Garowe, 21st Sector at Dusa Mareb, and 60th Sector at Baidoa. Thirteen divisions, averaging 3,300 strong, were divided between the four sectors – four in the northernmost and three in each of the other sectors. The sectors were under the command of brigadiers (three) and a colonel (one). Mohammed Said Hersi Morgan has been reported as 26th Sector commander from 1986 to 1988. Barre's son, Maslah Mohammed Siad Barre was commanding the 77th Sector in Mogadishu in November 1987, and later became Chief of Staff (also reported as Commander-in-Chief) of the Army. Maslah may have become Commander-in-Chief in early March 1989.

By the mid-1980s, more resistance movements supported by Ethiopia's Derg administration had sprung up across the country. Barre responded by ordering punitive measures against those he perceived as locally supporting the guerillas, especially in the northern regions. The clampdown included bombing of cities, with the northwestern administrative center of Hargeisa, a Somali National Movement (SNM) stronghold, among the targeted areas in 1988.

Compagnon writes that:

Military exercises between the United States and the Siad Barre regime continued during the 1980s. After Exercise Eastern Wind ’83, the Los Angeles Times was told that "the exercise failed dismally.…The Somali army did not perform up to any standard," one diplomat said. … "The inefficiency of the Somali armed forces is legendary among foreign military men." 'Valiant Usher '86' took place during the U.S. Fiscal Year of 1986, but actually in late 1985, and the 24th Marine Expeditionary Unit participated in Exercise Eastern Wind in August 1987 in the area of Geesalay (in the vicinity of Cape Guardafui). U.S. Army elements conducted training with the Somali 31st Commando Brigade at Baledogle Airfield outside Mogadishu in 1989.

As of 1 June 1989, the International Institute for Strategic Studies estimated that the Army comprised four corps and 12 division headquarters. The IISS noted that these formations 'were in name only; below establishment in units, men, and equipment. Brigades were of battalion size.' In 1989-90 six military sectors , twelve divisions, four tank brigades, 45 mechanized and infantry brigades, 4 commando brigades, one surface-to-air missile brigade, three field artillery brigades, 30 field battalions [sic: probably field artillery battalions], and one air defence artillery battalion were listed. The armed forces declined in size from a possible high of 65,000 in early 1990 to about 10,000 later that year, due to desertions and battlefield defeats.

On 12–13 November 1989, a group of Hawiye officers and men belonging to the 4th Division at Galkayo, in Mudug, mutinied. General Barre's son, Maslah, lead a force of Marehan clansmen to suppress the mutiny. Punishment was meted out to local Hawiye villages. In mid-November 1989, rebel forces briefly captured Galkayo. They reportedly seized significant quantities of military equipment at the 4th Division Headquarters, including tanks, 30 mobile anti-aircraft guns and rocket launchers. However, the rebels were unable to take most of this equipment so they incinerated it. Government forces thereafter launched massive reprisals against civilians residing in the regions corresponding with the 21st, 54th, 60th and 77th military sectors. The impacted towns and villages included Gowlalo, Dagaari, Sadle-Higlo, Bandiir Adley, Galinsor, Wargalo, Do'ol, Halimo, Go'ondalay and Galkayo.

By mid-1990, USC insurgents had captured most of the towns and villages surrounding Mogadishu. On 8 November 1990, USC forces launched attack on the government garrison at Bulo-Burte, killing the commander. From 30 December 1990, there was a major upsurge in local violence in Mogadishu, and continuous fighting between government troops and USC insurgents. The next four weeks were marked by increasing rebel gains. On 27 January 1991, Siad Barre fled the capital for Kismayo, along with many of his supporters. This marked the culmination of the first phase of the civil war. 
By this time the Armed Forces had dissolved, split into clan factions. On 23 January 1992, the UN Security Council imposed an arms embargo via United Nations Security Council Resolution 733 to stop the flow of weapons to feuding militia groups. Much military equipment was left in situ, deteriorating, and was sometimes discovered and photographed by intervention forces in the early 1990s.

In May 2019, the New York Times reported that a former commander of the SNA's Fifth Brigade in northern Somalia had been found responsible for torture during the 1980s by a U.S. jury.

Interregnum in the 1990s 
Some of the militias that were then competing for power saw UNOSOM's presence as a threat to their hegemony. Consequently, gun battles took place in Mogadishu between local gunmen and peacekeepers. Among these was the Battle of Mogadishu in October 1993, part of an unsuccessful operation by U.S. troops to apprehend Somali National Alliance faction leader Mohamed Farrah Aidid. UN soldiers eventually withdrew altogether from the country on March 3, 1995, having incurred more significant casualties.

After UNOSOM II's departure in March 1995, military clashes between local factions became shorter, generally less intense, and more localized. This was in part due to the large-scale UN military intervention that had helped to curb the intense fighting between the major factions, who then began to focus on consolidating gains that they had made. The local peace and reconciliation initiatives that had been undertaken in the south-central part of the country between 1993 and 1995 also generally had a positive impact.

Twenty-first century 

It was reported on 7 November 2001, that Transitional National Government (TNG) military forces had seized control of Marka in Lower Shabelle.
From 2002, Ismail Qasim Naji served as the TNG military chief. He was given the rank of Major General. The TNG's new army, made up of 90 women and 2,010 men, was equipped on 21 March 2002 with guns and armed wagons surrendered to the TNG by private parties in exchange for money, according to TNG officials. TNG president Abdulkassim Salat Hassan instructed the recruits to use the weaponry to "pacify Mogadishu and other parts of Somalia by fighting bandits, anarchists and all forces that operate for survival outside the law." But the TNG controlled only one part of Mogadishu; rival warlords controlled the remainder. Some TNG weapons were stolen and looted in late 2002. During this time, the TNG was opposed militarily and politically by the rival Somalia Reconciliation and Restoration Council (SRRC).

Eventually the leadership of the SRRC and the TNG were reconciled, and the Transitional Federal Government (TFG) was formed in 2004 by Somali politicians in Nairobi. Abdullahi Yusuf Ahmed from Puntland was elected as President. The TFG later moved its temporary headquarters to Baidoa. President Yusuf requested that the African Union deploy military forces in Somalia. However, as the AU lacked the resources to do so, Yusuf brought in his own militia from Puntland. Along with the U.S. funding the ARPCT coalition, this alarmed many in south-central Somalia, and recruits flocked to the ascendant Islamic Courts Union (ICU).

A battle for Mogadishu followed in the first half of 2006 in which the ARPCT confronted the ICU. However, with local support, the ICU captured the city in June of the year. It then expanded its area of control in south-central Somalia over the following months, assisted militarily by Eritrea. In an effort at reconciliation, TFG and ICU representatives held several rounds of talks in Khartoum under the auspices of the Arab League. The meetings ended unsuccessfully due to uncompromising positions retained by both parties. Hardline Islamists subsequently gained power within the ICU, prompting fears of a Talibanization of the movement.

In December 2006, Ethiopian troops entered Somalia to assist the TFG against the advancing Islamic Courts Union, initially winning the Battle of Baidoa. On 28 December 2006, the allied forces recaptured the capital from the ICU. The offensive helped the TFG solidify its rule. Ethiopian and TFG forces forced the ICU from Ras Kamboni between 7–12 January 2007. They were assisted by at least two U.S. air strikes. On 8 January 2007, for the first time since taking office, President Ahmed entered Mogadishu from Baidoa, as the TFG moved its base to the national capital. President Ahmed brought his Puntland army chief with him, and Abdullahi Ali Omar became Somali chief of army on 10 February 2007.

On 20 January 2007, through United Nations Security Council Resolution 1744, the African Union Mission in Somalia (AMISOM) was formally authorised. Seven hundred Ugandan troops, earmarked for AMISOM, were landed at Mogadishu airport on 7–8 March 2007.

In Mogadishu, Hawiye residents resented the Islamic Courts Union's defeat. They distrusted the TFG, which was at the time dominated by the Darod clan, believing that it was dedicated to the advancement of Darod interests in lieu of the Hawiye. Additionally, they feared reprisals for massacres committed in 1991 in Mogadishu by Hawiye militants against Darod civilians, and were dismayed by Ethiopian involvement. Critics of the TFG likewise charged that its federalist platform was part of a plot by the Ethiopian government to keep Somalia weak and divided. During its first few months in the capital, the TFG was initially restricted to key strategic points, with the large northwestern and western suburbs controlled by Hawiye rebels. In March 2007, President Ahmed announced plans to forcibly disarm militias in the city. Extremist elements of the ICU, including Al-Shabaab then launched a wave of attacks against the TFG and Ethiopian troops. The allied forces in return mounted a heavy-handed response.

All of the warring parties were responsible for widespread violations of the laws of war, as civilians were caught in the ensuing crossfire. Insurgents reportedly deployed militants and established strongholds in heavily populated neighborhoods, launched mortar rounds from residential areas, and targeted public and private individuals for assassination and violence. TFG forces alleged to have failed to efficaciously warn civilians in combat zones, impeded relief efforts, plundered property, in some instances engaged in murder and violence, and mistreated detainees during mass arrests. According to HRW, the implicated TFG forces included military, police and intelligence personnel, as well as the private guards of senior TFG officials. Victims were often unable to identify TFG personnel, and confused militiamen aligned with TFG officials with TFG police officers and other state security personnel.

In May 2007, U.S. diplomats spoke with the TFG's Ambassador to Ethiopia. Among the topics of conversation were Somali security forces, and Ambassador Abdulkarim Farah said that the TFG had trained nearly 7,000 militia in Baledogle who were now patrolling throughout Somalia, from Kismayo to Puntland. Another 3,500 militia were undergoing training. Farah said that on 18 May he planned to his hometown of Beledweyne to establish a militia training camp there, at the instruction of President Yusuf. Farah estimated that approximately 60 per cent of the militia were Darod, 30 per cent were Hawiye, and the remaining 10 per cent were from other clans; the majority of security forces in Mogadishu were Darod. He said that the TFG had not sought to exclude Darod from the militia, and attributed the imbalance to Hawiye having primarily supported the Council of Islamic Courts (CIC).

In December 2008, the International Crisis Group reported:

Yusuf has built a largely subservient and loyal apparatus by putting his fellow Majerteen clansmen in strategic positions. The National Security Agency (NSA) under General Mohamed Warsame ("Darwish") and the so-called "Majerteen militia" units in the TFG army operate in parallel and often above other security agencies. Their exact number is hard to ascertain, but estimates suggest about 2,000. They are well catered for, well armed and often carry out counter-insurgency operations with little or no coordination with other security agencies. In the short term, this strategy may appear effective for the president, who can unilaterally employ the force essentially as he pleases. However, it undermines morale in the security services and is a cause of their high desertion rates.

Much of the problem building armed forces was the lack of functioning TFG government institutions:
 
Beyond the endemic internal power struggles, the TFG has faced far more serious problems in establishing its authority and rebuilding the structures of governance. Its writ has never extended much beyond Baidoa. Its control of Mogadishu is ever more contested, and it is largely under siege in the rest of the country. There are no properly functioning government institutions.

Also in December 2008, Human Rights Watch described the Somali National Army as the 'TFG's largely theoretical professional military force.' It said that 'where trained TFG military forces appear, 'they were identified by their victims as Ethiopian-trained forces, often acting in concert with ENDF (Ethiopian National Defense Force) forces or under the command of ENDF officers.' HRW also said that 'Human Rights Watch's own research has uncovered a pattern of violent abuses by TFG forces including widespread acts of murder, rape, looting, assault, arbitrary arrest and detention, and torture. Those responsible include police, military, and intelligence personnel as well as the personal militias of high-ranking TFG officials.'
 
HRW went on to say: 'The TFG has deployed a confusing array of security forces and armed militias to act on its behalf. Victims of the widespread abuses in which these forces have been implicated often have trouble identifying whether their attackers were TFG police officers, other TFG security personnel, or militias linked to TFG officials. Furthermore, formal command-and-control structures are to a large degree illusory. TFG security forces often wear multiple hats, acting on orders from their formal superiors one day, as clan militias another day, and as autonomous self-interested armed groups the next.'

In April 2009, donors at a UN-sponsored conference pledged over $250 million to help improve security. The funds were earmarked for AMISOM and supporting Somalia's security, including the build-up of a security force of 6,000 members as well as an augmented police force of 10,000 men. In June 2009, the Somali military received 40 tonnes worth of arms and ammunition from the U.S. government to assist it in combating the insurgency.

In November 2010, a new technocratic government was elected to office. In its first 50 days in office, the new administration completed its first monthly payment of stipends to government fighters. It was the first of many Somali administrations to announce plans for a full biometric register for the security forces. While it aimed to complete the biometric register within four months, little further was reported. By August 2011, AMISOM and Somali forces had managed to capture all of Mogadishu from Al-Shabaab.

Powerful vested interests and corrupt commanders were, as of February 2011, the largest obstacle to reforming the army. Some newly delivered weaponry was sold by officers. The International Crisis Group also said that AMISOM's efforts at assisting in formalizing the military's structure and providing training to the estimated 8,000 SNA were problematic. Resistance continued to the establishment of an effective chain of command, logical military formations and a credible troop roster. Although General Mohamed Gelle Kahiye, the respected former army chief, attempted to instill reforms, he was marginalized and eventually dismissed.

In October 2011, following a weekend preparatory meeting between Somali and Kenyan military officials in the town of Dhobley, the Kenya Defence Forces launched an attack across the border against Al-Shabaab, aiming for Kismayo. In early June 2012, Kenyan troops were formally integrated into AMISOM.

In January 2012, Somali government forces and their AMISOM allies launched offensives on Al-Shabaab's last foothold on the northern outskirts of Mogadishu. The following month, Somali forces fighting alongside AMISOM seized Baidoa from the insurgent group. By June 2012, the allied forces had also captured El Bur, Afgooye, and Balad. Progress by the Kenya Army from the border towards Kismayo was slow, but Afmadow was also reported captured on 1 June 2012.

Creation of Federal Government 
The Federal Government of Somalia was established in August/September 2012. On 6 March 2013, United Nations Security Council Resolution 2093 was passed. The resolution lifted the purchase ban on light weapons for a provisional period of one year, but retained restrictions on the procurement of heavy arms such as surface-to-air missiles and artillery.

On 13 March 2013, Dahir Adan Elmi was appointed Chief of Army at a transfer ceremony in Mogadishu, where he replaced Abdulkadir Sheikh Dini. Abdirizak Khalif Elmi was appointed as Elmi's new Deputy Chief of Army.

In August 2013, Federal Government of Somalia officials and Jubaland regional representatives signed an agreement in Addis Ababa brokered by the Government of Ethiopia, which stipulated that all Jubaland security elements will be integrated into the Somali National Army. The Juba Interim Administration would control the regional police.

In November 2013, the United Nations Support Office for AMISOM (UNSOA) was directed to support the SNA across South Central Somalia. They were to better supply a force of 10,900 Somalis to fight al-Shabaab forces. The SNA force would initially be trained by the AMISOM contingents. On the passing of specific UN requirements, designated SNA battalions would then participate in joint operations with AMISOM. UNSOA's support during the period comprised food supplements, shelter, fuel, water and medical support.

In early March 2014, Somali security forces and AMISOM troops launched another operation against Al-Shabaab in southern Somalia. According to Prime Minister Abdiweli Sheikh Ahmed, the government subsequently launched stabilization efforts in the newly liberated areas, which included Rab Dhuure, Hudur, Wajid and Burdhubo. However, there were continuing concerns that not enough was being done to revitalise and secure the newly liberated areas. By 26 March, the allied forces had liberated ten towns within the month, including Qoryoley and El Buur. UN Special Representative for Somalia Nicholas Kay described the military advance as the most significant and geographically extensive offensive since AU troops began operations in 2007.

In August 2014, the Somali government launched Operation Indian Ocean. On 1 September 2014, a U.S. drone strike carried out as part of the broader mission killed Al-Shabaab leader Moktar Ali Zubeyr. U.S. authorities hailed the raid as a major symbolic and operational loss for Al-Shabaab, and the Somali government offered a 45-day amnesty to all moderate members of the militant group.

In October 2014, Federal Government officials signed an agreement in Garowe with Puntland, which said that the Federal and Puntland authorities will work to form an integrated national army. In April 2015, another bilateral treaty stipulated that Puntland would contribute 3,000 troops to the Somali National Army. In May 2015, President Hassan Sheikh Mohamud and the heads of the Puntland, Jubaland and Interim South West Administrations signed a seven-point agreement in Garowe authorizing the immediate deployment of 3,000 troops from Puntland for the Somali National Army. The leaders also agreed to integrate soldiers from the other regional states into the SNA.

In 2016 The Economist reported that the SNA did not exist as a cohesive force due to high rates of desertions and many soldiers being primarily loyal to clan leaders rather than the government.

Somali National Army from 2008

Training and facilities 

In November 2009, the European Union announced its intention to train two Somali battalions (around 2,000 troops), which would complement other training missions and bring the total number of better-trained Somali soldiers to 6,000. The two battalions were expected to be ready by August 2011. 

In August 2011, as part of the European Union Training Mission Somalia (EUTM Somalia), 900 Somali soldiers graduated from the Bihanga Military Training School in the Ibanda District of Uganda. 150 personnel from the EU took part in the training process, which trained around 2,000 Somali troops per year. In May 2012, 603 Somali army personnel completed training at the facility. They were the third batch of Somali nationals to be trained there under the auspices of EUTM Somalia. In total, the EU mission had trained 3,600 Somali soldiers, before permanently transferring all of its advisory, mentoring and training activities to Mogadishu in December 2013.

In September 2011, President Sharif Sheikh Ahmed laid down the foundation for a new military camp for the army in the Jazeera District of Mogadishu. The $3.2 million construction project was funded by the EU and was expected to take six months to complete.

In June 2013, Egyptian engineers arrived to build new headquarters for the Somalia Ministry of Defence.

In February 2014, EUTM Somalia began its first "Train the Trainers" programme at the Jazeera Training Camp in Mogadishu. 60 Somali National Army soldiers that had been previously trained by EUTM in Uganda would take part in a four-week refresher course on infantry techniques and procedures, including international humanitarian law and military ethics. The training would be conducted by 16 EU trainers. Following the course's completion, the Somali soldiers would be qualified as instructors to then train SNA recruits, with mentoring provided by EUTM Somalia personnel. A team of EUTM Somalia advisors also started offering strategic advice to the Somali Ministry of Defence and General Staff. Additionally, capacity building, advice and specific mentoring with regard to security sector development and training are envisioned for 2014.

In February 2014, Chief of Staff Brigadier General Dahir Adan Elmi announced that Somalia's Ministry of Defence began holding military training inside the country for the first time, with Somali instructors now teaching courses to units that joined the armed forces. He also indicated that SNA leaders had created new numbered units for the army, and that the soldiers were slated to have their respective name and unit placed on their uniform. Additionally, Elmi stated that the military had implemented a new biometric registration system, wherein each recently trained and armed soldier is photographed and fingerprinted. By the end of 2014, 17,000 national army soldiers and police officers had registered for the new biometric remuneration system. 13,829 SNA soldiers and 5,134 Somali Police Force officials were biometrically registered in the system as of May 2015.

In July 2014, the governments of the United States and France announced that they would start providing training to the Somali National Army. According to U.S. Defense Department officials, American military advisers are also stationed in Somalia.

In September 2014, 20 Somali federal soldiers began training courses in Djibouti, which were organized by the government of Djibouti.

In September 2014, a Somali government delegation led by Prime Minister Abdiweli Sheikh Ahmed attended an international conference in London hosted by the British government, which centered on rebuilding the Somali National Army and strengthening the security sector in Somalia. Ahmed presented to the participants his administration's plan for the development of the Somali Armed Forces, as well as fiscal planning, human rights protection, arms embargo compliance, and ways to integrate regional militias. The summit also aimed to arrange funding for the armed forces. British Prime Minister David Cameron said that the meeting sought to outline a long-term security plan to strengthen Somalia's army, police and judiciary.

In March 2015, the Federal Cabinet agreed to establish a new commission tasked with overseeing the nationalization and integration of security forces in the country. In April 2015, the Commission on Regional Militia Integration presented its plan for the formal integration of regional forces, with UNSOM providing support and strategic advice.

In April 2015, the federal Ministry of Defence launched its new Guulwade Plan (Victory Plan), which provides a roadmap for long-term development of the military. It was formulated with technical support from UNSOM. The framework stipulates that international partners are slated to provide capacity-building as well as assistance for joint operations to 10,900 Somali national army troops, with these units drawn from various regions in the country.

As of April 2015, UNSOM coordinates international security sector assistance for the SNA in accordance with the Somali federal government's priority areas. It also provides advice on recruitment of female officers, strictures on age appropriate military personnel, legal frameworks vis-a-vis the defence institutions, and a development strategy for the Ministry of Defence. Beginning in the month, the US government also funded the payment of 9,495 army allowances.

In May 2015, President Hassan Sheikh Mohamud officially opened a new military training camp in Mogadishu. Construction of the centre began in 2014 in conjunction with the government of the United Arab Emirates. Situated in the Hodan district, it is one of several new military academies in the country.

As of May 2015, the federal government in conjunction with UNSOM was working toward establishing a comprehensive, international standards and obligations-compliant ammunition and weapons management system. To this end, capacity-building for the physical management of arms and bookkeeping was being developed, and new storage facilities and armouries for weapons and explosives were being constructed.

Strength and units 
In April 2011, 1,000 recruits completed training in Uganda as a part of the agreement with the EU destined for the newly forming Brigades 4, 5, and 6. With a post-training drop-out rate of around 10%, the vast majority of the EUTM trainees continued to serve in the SNA after their period abroad.

In 2013, divisions, effectively serving as area commands, began to be reformed: initially Division 60 at Baidoa (1 July 2013), later joined by Division 21 at Dhusamareb (30 August 2013).  In the Kismayo/Jubaland area, after Ahmed Madobe had established himself, commanders from the Mogadishu area were somewhat isolated by differing clan connections. Yet they were technically heads of SNA Division 43 (Somalia): in reality more of a "paper" area command than a division. Then on 27 July 2015 a swearing in ceremony took place for 1,517 new SNA fighters from Lower Juba and Kismayo, and they formed multi-clan battalions. Very little support or even no support was provided to this group, located at the old Kismayo Airport, in the twelve months to February 2016. By January 2016 it appeared that up to 500 had drifted away, dropping out of the integration process.

Also established by 2014 was Division "12 April", supervising Somali troops in the areas of AMISOM Sectors 1 and 5 around Mogadishu. In March 2013 there were technically six brigades around Mogadishu, but their motivation to fight al-Shabaab in an organised fashion, as opposed to operating as clan militia, was doubtful. The six brigades were as of July 2013 largely composed of officers from various Hawiye sub-clans, with some Marehan-Darod and minorities also present. Five brigades primarily consisted of Abgaal, Murosade and Hawadle soldiers. Brigade 3 over the same period comprised 840 fighters, most of whom belong to the Hawiye-Habar Gidir/Ayr clan. The brigade was around 30% to 50% smaller in size than the other five brigades in the wider Mogadishu area. Led by General Mohamed Roble Jimale 'Gobale,' it occupied areas in Lower Shabelle, including Merka, and along the Afgoye corridor. The UN Monitoring Group reported that many Brigade 3 fighters had been drawn from militias controlled by Yusuf Mohamed Siyaad 'Indha Adde', a close associate of Jimale and the former Eritrean-backed chief of defence for the Alliance for the Re-liberation of Somalia-Asmara. Gobale was killed in a suspected Al-Shabaab attack on 18 September 2016. Brigade 3's primary focus became "the domination of the valuable riverine land and its businesses for financial gain. In the process, the local people, often from minority clans such as the Biimaal, were constantly oppressed, with numerous atrocities committed," including arbitrary torture of civilians.

As of May–June 2014, numbers were reportedly estimated at 20,000 (including around 1,500 female).

In June 2014, Garowe Online referred to the Brigade 5 and Brigade 6 of the SNA, in Lower Shabelle. Brigades 5 and 6 have fought against Al-Shabaab including in Mogadishu and Afgoye. 

In February 2014, the Federal Government concluded a six-month training course for the first Commandos, Danab (Somali: "Lightning"), since 1991. Training was carried out by Bancroft Global Development, a U.S. private military contractor, paid by AMISOM which is then reimbursed by the U.S. State Department. The aim was to create a mixed-clan unit. The Danab unit was established at Baledogle Airfield, in Walaweyn District, Lower Shabelle. The training of the first Danab unit began in October 2013, with 150 recruits. As of July 2014, training of the second unit was underway. According to General Elmi, the training is geared toward both urban and rural environments, and is aimed at preparing the soldiers for guerrilla warfare and all other types of modern military operations. Elmi said that a total of 570 recruits were expected to have completed training by U.S. security personnel by the end of 2014.

Agreements 

In February 2012, Somali Prime Minister Abdiweli Mohamed Ali and Italian Defence Minister Gianpaolo Di Paola agreed that Italy would assist the Somali military as part of the National Security and Stabilization Plan, an initiative designed to strengthen and professionalize the national security forces. In November 2014, the Federal Parliament approved a new defense and cooperation treaty with Italy, which the Ministry of Defence had signed earlier in the year. The agreement included training and equipping of the army by Italy.

In November 2014, Somalia signed a military cooperation agreement with the United Arab Emirates.

Somalia signed military cooperation agreements with Turkey in May 2010, February 2014, and January 2015. In early 2016 another agreement was signed to open Camp TURKSOM in Mogadishu, at which Turkish Armed Forces officers were to train Somali recruits. Over 1,500 Somalis were to be trained by 200 Turkish personnel. A military school in Somalia to train officers was also planned.

Disappearances of Somali soldiers
In January 2021, the families of 370 Somali soldiers who were sent to Eritrea for training began protesting in Mogadishu, due to loss of contact with their relatives since November 2019. The parents of the soldiers called on President Mohamed Abdullahi Mohamed "Faarmajo" to give them information as to their sons' whereabouts after the former deputy of Somalia's National Intelligence and Security Agency Abdisalan Yusuf Guled claimed the soldiers have died fighting in the Tigray region of Ethiopia. Mohamed's office has denied the claim. A parliamentary committee, the foreign affairs and defense committee, has demanded an explanation from President Farmaajo calling on him to dispatch a fact-finding mission to Asmara for an investigation into the disappearances. On May 23, 2022, the last day of his presidency, Farmajo confirmed that 5,000 soldiers have concluded their training in Eritrea in mid 2021, saying that their return was delayed because of the (s)election process.

Army equipment 

Previous arms acquisitions included the following equipment, much of which was unserviceable circa June 1989:
293 main battle tanks (30 Centurion from Kuwait, 123 M47 Patton, 30 T-34, 110 T-54/55 from various sources). Other armoured fighting vehicles included 10 M41 Walker Bulldog light tanks, 30 BRDM-2 and 15 Panhard AML-90 armored cars (formerly owned by Saudi Arabia). The IISS estimated in 1989 that there were 474 armoured personnel carriers, including 64 BTR-40/BTR-50/BTR-60, 100 BTR-152 wheeled armored personnel carriers, 310 Fiat 6614 and 6616s, and that BMR-600s had been reported. The IISS estimated that there were 210 towed artillery pieces (8 M-1944 100 mm, 100 M-56 105 mm, 84 M-1938 122 mm, and 18 M198 155 mm towed howitzers). Other equipment reported by the IISS included 82 mm and 120 mm mortars, 100 Milan and BGM-71 TOW anti-tank guided missiles, rocket launchers, recoilless rifles, and a variety of Soviet air defence guns of 20 mm, 23 mm, 37 mm, 40 mm, 57 mm, and 100 mm calibre.

Equipment donations, 2012–2013 
Among firearms associated with the Somali National Army and reported by Jane's Infantry Weapons 2009/10 were Soviet TT pistols, British Sterling submachine guns; Heckler & Koch G3 and Belgian FN FAL assault rifles, U.S. M14 rifles, 
Soviet RPD machine guns; Soviet RPK machine guns; Soviet RP-46 machine guns; French AA-52 machine guns; Belgian FN MAG machine guns; Soviet DShK heavy machine guns; U.S. M2 Browning .50 cal heavy machine guns; and U.S. M79 grenade launchers and Soviet RPG-2 grenade launchers.

In May 2012, over thirty-three vehicles were donated by the U.S. government to the SNA. The vehicles include 16 Magirus trucks, 4 Hilux pickups, 6 Land Cruiser pickups, 1 water tanker, and 6 water trailers. On 9 April 2013, the U.S. government approved the provision of defense articles and services by the American authorities to the Somali Federal Government. It handed over 15 vehicles to the new Commandos in March 2014.

In April 2013, Djibouti presented the SNA with 15 armoured military vehicles. The equipment was part of a larger consignment of 25 military trucks and 25 armoured military vehicles. The same month, the Italian government handed over 54 armored and personnel carrier vehicles to the army at a ceremony in Mogadishu.

As of April 2015, the Ministry of Defence's Guulwade Plan identifies the equipment and weaponry requirements of the army.

Thirteen ACMAT Bastion APCs were planned to be transferred in 2016, supplied via the U.S. Department of Defense. Yet in 2018, an industry source explained to Jane's that none had actually been supplied.

Somali Air Force 
A Somali Aeronautical Corps (in Italian: "Corpo di Sicurezza della Somalia") was established in the 1950s during the trusteeship period prior to independence. Original equipment included six to eight North American P-51D Mustangs. It grew to become the Somali Air Force, with Italian aid, in the early 1960s. The initial equipment of the SAF included Douglas C-47s, which remained in service until 1968, and a variety of small transports and trainers. However, all the surviving Mustangs were returned to Italy before Somalia gained its independence in June 1960. The air force operated most of its aircraft from bases near Mogadishu, Hargeisa and Galkayo. An air defence force equipped with Soviet SA-2 missiles, anti-aircraft guns, and early warning radars was in existence by September 1974. It was organised into seven anti-aircraft gun & missile brigades, and one radar brigade, numbering about 3,500 personnel. In June 1983, the government took delivery of 9 Hawker Hunters and 4 Islander aircraft from the United Arab Emirates at the port in Mogadishu.

By January 1991 the air force was in ruins. In 2012, Italy offered to help rebuild the air force. In 2016 the air force was described as 150 retirees from the Siad Barre era, without any aircraft. Other late 2016-early 2017 figures from the SJPER said 170. The air force's personnel were located in a camp on the outskirts of Mogadishu International Airport.

Somali Navy 

The Somali Navy was formed after independence in 1960. Prior to 1991, it participated in several joint exercises with the United States, Great Britain and Canada. It disintegrated during the beginning of the civil war in Somalia, from the late 1980s.

Announcement that naval rebuilding efforts would begin date from the first decade of the 21st century. Admiral Farah Ahmed Omar told a New Yorker reporter in December 2009 that the navy was 'practically nothing' at the time, though five hundred new recruits were in training. On 30 June 2012, the United Arab Emirates announced a contribution of $1 million toward enhancing Somalia's naval security. Boats, equipment and communication gear necessary for the rebuilding of the coast guard would be bought. A central operations naval command was also planned to be set up in Mogadishu.

Chief of Defence Force 

Barre became Chief of Staff, and then SAF commander; General Mohammad Ali Samatar became Chair, Peace and Security Committee, in December 1974 while remaining commandant of the Army and Secretary of State for Defence, while Brigadier General Abdalla Mohamed Fail was Samatar's deputy, and First Vice-Commandant of the Army; Samatar was Commander-in-Chief in 1976; Maslah Mohammed Siad Barre became SNA Commander-in-Chief in 1989; Brigadier General Mohammed Said Hersi Morgan became commander-in-chief on 25 November 1990.

From the mid-2010s, the title of the senior military officer has been Chief of Defence Force.

Ranks, uniform, and camouflage 

In July 2014, General Dahir Adan Elmi announced the completion of a review of the Somali National Army ranks. The SNA in conjunction with the Ministry of Defense is also slated to standardize the martial ranking system and eliminate any unauthorized promotions as part of a broader reform.
Officers

Enlisted

Uniform and camouflage 
Somalia's Army had very little variation in their uniforms since their inception, the most common camouflage is woodland camouflage but in recent years, Somalia has now have access to digital camouflage as well. Somalia's more common service uniform consists of fatigues and coloured berets on which rank insignia can be displayed and coloured gorget patches, shoulder patches that display their unit although there is a more formal variant that resembles British Service Dress but is khaki in colour.

Notes

References
 
 
 
 
 
 Defense Intelligence Agency, 'Military Intelligence Summary, Vol IV, Part III, Africa South of the Sahara', November 1987
 
 Human Rights Watch, Human Rights Abuses by Transitional Federal Government Forces in 'So Much to Fear: War Crimes and Devastation in Somalia', December 2008
 
 
 
  Department of the Army Pamphlet 550-86.
 
  (DT407 M697 S)

Further reading
 Baffour Agyeman-Duah, The Horn of Africa: Conflict, Demilitarization and Reconstruction, Journal of Conflict Studies, Vol. 16, No. 2, 1996, accessed at https://journals.lib.unb.ca/index.php/JCS/article/view/11813/12632#a50
 Brian Crozier, The Soviet Presence in Somalia, Institute for the Study of Conflict, London, 1975
 Irving Kaplan et al., Area Handbook for Somalia, American University, 1969.
 Nilsson, Claes, and Johan Norberg, "European Union Training Mission Somalia: A Mission Assessment", Swedish National Defence Research Institute, 2014.
 
 Zacchia, Paolo B.; Harborne, Bernard; Sims, Jeff. 2017. Somalia - Security and Justice Sector Public Expenditure Review. Washington, D.C. : World Bank Group. http://documents.worldbank.org/curated/en/644671486531571103/Somalia-Security-and-justice-sector-public-expenditure-review

External links 
 Air Combat Information Group, Somalia, 1980–1996
 "Weapons at War", a World Policy Institute Issue Brief by William D. Hartung, May 1995, chapter III: Strengthening Potential Adversaries (12th paragraph), Somalia.
 United States State Department, 1973MOGADI00510 Army Day Speeches (1973), 14 April 1973, via United States diplomatic cables leak
 https://www.africanaerospace.aero/somalia-battles-for-an-air-force-to-fight-against-terror.html – air force, 2018.
 https://www.csmonitor.com/World/Africa/2022/1209/Somalia-rallies-grassroots-to-oppose-jihadist-Al-Shabab.-Will-it-work - 2022

 
Military units and formations established in 1960
1960 establishments in Somalia